Eduardas Vilkas (October 3, 1935 – May 19, 2008) was a Lithuanian economist and politician.  In 1990 he was among those who signed the Act of the Re-Establishment of the State of Lithuania.

References
 Biography

1935 births
2008 deaths
Lithuanian politicians
Members of the Supreme Soviet of the Soviet Union